Chernomorets Arena is a planned future modern sports venue in Burgas, Bulgaria. The stadium will be built in the place of the old Chernomorets Stadium and will have an exact capacity of 30,000 spectators and a possible expansion to 55,000. It is scheduled to be opened in 2017 and it will be the new home ground of the local PFC Chernomorets Burgas. The construction will start in 2013, because of the global financial crisis, and will cost 500 million euros, making it one of the most expensive stadiums in Europe. The stadium will be part of a modern complex with a mall, underground parking area, indoor sports hall with a capacity of 3,500 spectators, three business towers and a five-star luxury hotel. The whole complex will cost 1 billion euros, according by the owner of Chernomorets and Petrol Holding AD Mitko Sabev.

The venue will be able to host matches of European football tournaments such as the UEFA Champions League and the UEFA Europa League, due to the lack of licensed stadiums in most parts of Eastern Bulgaria.
The stadium can also support a possible bid as a venue for the UEFA Euro 2020, which Bulgaria and Romania are planning to host.
As of July 2009, the construction of the complex is currently on hold, due to the global financial crisis, and according to the former managing director of the football club, Fredi Bobic, the project's main realization will start no sooner than 2011.

References

External links
 More information about the stadium

Proposed stadiums
Football venues in Bulgaria
Sports venues in Burgas